Reyburn Creek is a tributary of Shickshinny Creek in Luzerne County, Pennsylvania. It is designated as a Coldwater Fishery and a Migratory Fishery. Alluvium, Wisconsinan Outwash, Wisconsinan Till, Wisconsinan Ice-Contact Stratified Drift, Wisconsinan Bouldery Till, Wisconsinan Till Moraine, and bedrock consisting of shale and sandstone all occur near the creek.

Course
Reyburn Creek begins in a pond in Union Township. It meanders south for nearly a mile before reaching the community of Muhlenburg. The creek then turns south-southeast for a few miles, flowing alongside Reyburn Road. Eventually, it turns south for more than a mile and receives an unnamed tributary from the left. The creek then turns southwest and flows alongside Shickshinny Mountain for more than a mile until it reaches its confluence with Shickshinny Creek in the village of Koonsville, in Union Township.

Hydrology
The peak annual discharge of Reyburn Creek at its mouth has a 10 percent chance of reaching 1410 cubic feet per second. It has a 2 percent chance of reaching 2465 cubic feet per second and a 1 percent chance of reaching 3035 cubic feet per second. It has a 0.2 percent chance of reaching 4580 cubic feet per second.

It has a 2 percent chance of reaching 1545 cubic feet per second and a 1 percent chance of reaching 1910 cubic feet per second. It has a 0.2 percent chance of reaching 2950 cubic feet per second.

It has a 2 percent chance of reaching 1155 cubic feet per second and a 1 percent chance of reaching 1440 cubic feet per second. It has a 0.2 percent chance of reaching 2200 cubic feet per second.

Geography

The 30-mile-long (48-kilometer-long) Stanton-Susquehanna #2 transmission power line crosses Reyburn Creek and at least 14 other bodies of water. Part of Shickshinny Mountain is in the lower reaches of the watershed of the creek.

The surficial geology along most of Reyburn Creek features alluvium. However, Wisconsinan Outwash occurs along the creek in its lower and middle reaches and a glacial or resedimented till known as Wisconsinan Till occurs near the creek in its middle and upper reaches. Wisconsinan Ice-Contact Stratified Drift, which contains stratified sand and gravel and some boulders, also occurs in the watershed. Wisconsinan Bouldery Till and Wisconsinan Till Moraine also occurs in the vicinity of the creek, especially near its headwaters. Additionally, bedrock consisting of sandstone and shale occurs in the surficial geology of large parts of the watershed.

Watershed
The creek is entirely within the United States Geological Survey quadrangle of Shickshinny.

There are four features on Reyburn Creek that are identified as obstructions.

History
Reyburn Creek was entered into the Geographic Names Information System on August 2, 1979. Its identifier in the Geographic Names Information System is 1184964.

Reyburn Creek, along with 99 other streams, was added to the Pennsylvania Fish and Boat Commission's list of wild trout streams in May 2011. The decision by the Pennsylvania Fish and Boat Commission to add the streams was unanimous. This action considered as early as March 2011.

Biology
The entire drainage basin of Reyburn Creek is designated as a Coldwater Fishery and a Migratory Fishery. Wild trout naturally reproduce in the creek from its headwaters downstream to its mouth.

See also
Little Shickshinny Creek, next tributary of Shickshinny Creek going downstream
Culver Creek, next tributary of Shickshinny Creek going upstream
List of rivers of Pennsylvania

References

Rivers of Luzerne County, Pennsylvania
Tributaries of the Susquehanna River
Rivers of Pennsylvania